Sir Henry David Hardington Bartlett, 3rd Baronet (18 March 1912 – 13 September 1989) was a British fencer.

Biography
Bartlett was educated at Stowe School. In 1934 and 1935, he won the two foil title at the British Fencing Championships. The following year in 1936, he was selected to represent Great Britain at the 1936 Summer Olympics in Berlin. He competed in the individual foil event, finishing in fifth place in Pool 8. He also took part in the Men's team foil event, reaching the second round. 

In 1939, he was commissioned in the Royal Artillery.

References

1912 births
1989 deaths
British male fencers
Olympic fencers of Great Britain
Fencers at the 1936 Summer Olympics
Baronets in the Baronetage of the United Kingdom
People educated at Stowe School
Royal Artillery officers
British Army personnel of World War II